Leigh Mallory is the name of:

 Trafford Leigh-Mallory (1892–1944), British airman
 George Leigh Mallory (1886–1924), British mountaineer

See also
Mallory